Mundy (born Edmund Enright) is an Irish singer-songwriter.

Mundy may also refer to:

 Mundy Township, Michigan, a charter township in Genesee County
 Mundy Park, the largest park in Coquitlam, British Columbia
 Mundy (surname)